Sillu Karuppatti is a 2019 Indian Tamil-language romantic anthology film written, directed and edited by Halitha Shameem. The film stars Samuthirakani, Sunainaa, Manikandan K, Nivedhithaa Sathish, Kravmaga Sreeram, Leela Samson, Sara Arjun, and Rahul in the lead roles. The anthology consists of four short films based on relationships, which is set against the urban backdrops.

Halitha Shameem conceived the script during the pre-production works of Minmini and filming commenced in February 2017. Each shorts were filmed within 40 days, thus it took about two years to complete the entire film. The music and background score is composed by Pradeep Kumar, whereas cinematography for the film were handled jointly by Abhinandan Ramanujam, Manoj Paramahamsa, Vijay Kartik Kannan and Yamini Yagnamurthy.

Produced by Venkatesh Velineni of Divine Productions, the film was presented by Suriya of 2D Entertainment. The film opened to critical acclaim upon its release on 27 December 2019, and was commercially successful. It was also screened at few film festivals including Bengaluru International Film Festival and Toronto Tamil International Film Festival, and was well received by the audiences.

Plot

Pink Bag 
Maanja (Rahul), the teenaged ragpicker, begins to crush on Mity (Sara Arjun), a girl from a wealthy household, after stumbling upon her photo in the garbage from her home. Soon, he begins to collect knickknacks from her garbage everyday – a seemingly broken Walkman that has a recording of her song (she is an aspiring musician) and a ring that holds emotional value. But given their class difference, can he muscle up courage to give these back to her? And will she be able to see his ‘love’?

Kakka Kadi 
Madhu (Nivedhithaa Sathish) and Mugilan (Manikandan K) have a friendship that eventually blossoms into love. Mugilan works for a company and creates memes. Madhu is a fashion designer. They both share a cab quite often. Soon, Mugilan is diagnosed with scrotum cancer, and Madhu gives him love and hope.

Turtles 
A widower Navaneethan (Kravmaga Sreeram) spots Yashoda (Leela Samson) playing at a park and is instantly smitten by her. They get acquainted at the hospital – they are undergoing a master health checkup – and open up to each other about their respective lives over a turtle walk. While they have no problem beginning a conversation, unlike youngsters who have fallen in love, the doubts that crop up are more or less similar – "does he/she really love me?".

Hey Ammu 
A couple rediscovers passion after 12 years into their marriage when love has all but gotten lost in the mundanities of everyday life. The husband, Dhanapal (Samuthirakani) has no time for his wife, Amudhini (Sunaina) and her needs, both physical and emotional – though he does seem to be a good father to his kids. When Amudhini complains that he barely notices her – when other men compliment her on her new hairstyle – he shoots back that he is going bald but she, too, has not been giving that any notice. And when Amudhini reaches the end of her tether with Dhanapal's uncaring attitude, he tries to compensate by gifting her a virtual assistant – hoping that she would leave him alone as she now has someone to speak to.

Cast

Production

Development 
After debuting with the acclaimed children's film Poovarasam Peepee, Halitha Shameem then worked on the scripting of Minmini, which was under pre-production. In February 2017, she started working on an anthology film with Samuthirakani, Leela Samson, Sunainaa, Sara Arjun, K. Manikandan amongst others in leading roles; Halitha stated that the film is filled with nuances picked up from life, reading and lived experiences, further adding that "the film explores the strangeness that is prevalent in the relationships between the protagonists in each of these stories, which cover different age groups". Each shorts were filmed within 40–45 days and Shameem took two years to complete the entire film.

In July 2017, Halitha finished working on the anthology titled Turtles, featuring Samson and Krav Maga trainer Sreeram as the leads. The anthology features Samson who plays an unmarried, independent woman, and the story traces the bond she shares with the person whom she has rented her house to. The team completed filming two other's anthologies during October 2018, and the following week, Halitha filmed the fourth anthology featuring Samuthirakani and Sunainaa.

Casting 
Shameem wrote the script keeping Samuthirakani in mind, as she wanted to portray him as an affectionate, shy middle-aged man, since Samuthirakani was known for his activist and antagonist roles. Yamini Yagnamurthy, who worked as an assistant for P. C. Sreeram, made her debut in cinematography through this short film, whereas the other short films were filmed by Abhinandan Ramanujam, Manoj Paramahamsa and Vijay Kartik Kannan.

Filming 
This short film titled Hey Ammu was completed within 40 days, thus filming wrapped within November 2018.

Soundtrack 
Sillu Karuppatti's soundtrack album features only one song titled "Agam Thaanai" composed by Pradeep Kumar, which has lyrics written by the director Halitha Shameem. Kumar also recorded the track with Subiksha Rangarajan, crooning the female portions. The song was released on 20 February 2019, coinciding with the occasion of supermoon. Reviewing for the song "The sweet-sounding ballad begins with a hint of accordion, followed by Pradeep and Subiksha Rangarajan's vocals crisply paired with stunning orchestra, stands out in the song".

The original score features music by Pradeep Kumar, who took charge of the composition of the four short films in the anthology. The background score features use of multiple instruments such as guitar, drums, trumpet, tabla, flute, violin, accordion and strings, with Fames Macedonian Symphonic Orchestra also joining the sessions for the score. Rahul Ramachandran mixed the score and songs with Stuart Bruce took charge of mastering. On 7 August 2020, Think Music released the background score featuring 23 tracks in entirety through multiple platforms.

Marketing and release 
The official teaser of the film without featuring any dialogues, was unveiled on 26 December 2018 by actors Vijay Sethupathi and Arya. Shameem says she intentionally decided to cut the teaser as a montage of scenes set to music, and no dialogue stating "This is a conversation-based film, featuring interesting interactions between strangers. But, including dialogues might have revealed the plot or taken over the scenes, which showcase the first meeting/sighting of the character." The teaser opened to positive response from audience.

The film was scheduled for a theatrical release in late 2018, but was postponed indefinitely since no takers were approached to distribute the film. Suriya who released the film's trailer on 18 December 2019, also announced that he will present the film through 2D Entertainment, as well as Sakthivelan acquired the distribution rights under Sakthi Film Factory banner. The film released on 27 December 2019, and became a commercial success at the box office after running for over 50 days.

Sillu Karuppatti was premiered at the Bengaluru International Film Festival on 4 March 2020, and also at the Toronto Tamil Festival in September 2020. The film was also streamed via Netflix in April 2020.

Reception 
M. Suganth of The Times of India gave the film 4 out of 5 stars and wrote that "Sillu Karuppatti is so lovingly crafted with endearing performances, aesthetic visuals (though four cinematographers have worked on it, the film does an amazing job in keeping the visual tone consistent) and emotive music (by Pradeep Kumar) that superbly complement the perceptive writing. S. Subhakeerthana of The Indian Express gave 3.5 out of 5 stating "Don't miss these cleverly-cut stories, which will engage deeply with you". S. Srivatsavan of The Hindu wrote "Halitha Shameem captures the essense [sic] of love through four shorts — each of which deals with different phases of life".

Janani K of India Today gave 4 out of 5 and summarised "Sillu Karupatti may be a film about love, but it is the humour that sets it apart from other films of the ilk. If you look past some crazy coincidences, this is a bittersweet film which will make you smile throughout reminding you to live the moment." Anjana Shekar of The News Minute gave 3 out of 5 stating "The film manages to keep us engaged, while smoothly veering away from cliches." Baradwaj Rangan of Film Companion wrote "The episodes are interconnected through people and objects and even stray animals and birds. These connections don't appear contrived, because the basic thread is... human connection."

Sify gave 3.5 out of 5 stating it as "A well-written feel-good film". Behindwoods gave 3 out of 5 and stated "Sillu Karuppatti is a positive and sweet concoction of lovingly made stories. Do not miss this entertaining gem." Indiaglitz gave the film 3.25 out of 5 and stated "Sillu Karuppatti is a completely positive, refreshing, must watch entertainer that'll make you fall in love with the characters, celebrate love, and comes as a breath of fresh air amidst routine mass entertainers."

Awards and nominations

References

External links 

 
 

2019 films
2010s Tamil-language films
Indian anthology films
Indian romance films
2019 romance films